Fukuoka Financial Group is a Japanese company. Assets — $128.9 billion (2015). It is listed on the Nikkei 225.

Japan's Fukuoka Financial, Eighteenth Bank to extend timeline indefinitely

References

External links 

Companies listed on the Tokyo Stock Exchange
Companies listed on the Osaka Exchange
Companies listed on the Fukuoka Stock Exchange
Companies based in Fukuoka Prefecture
2007 establishments in Japan